The William Hall Walker Gymnasium is an athletic facility on the campus of the Stevens Institute of Technology in the City of Hoboken in Hudson County, New Jersey. It is located near Sixth Street on Fieldhouse Road in the Castle Point section of the city. Built from 1915 to 1916, the building was added to the National Register of Historic Places on May 9, 2019, for its significance in architecture.

See also
National Register of Historic Places listings in Hudson County, New Jersey

References

External links
 

Buildings and structures in Hoboken, New Jersey
Stevens Institute of Technology
Neoclassical architecture in New Jersey
Gyms in the United States
National Register of Historic Places in Hudson County, New Jersey
University and college buildings on the National Register of Historic Places in New Jersey
Sports venues completed in 1916
1916 establishments in New Jersey
Brick buildings and structures
New Jersey Register of Historic Places